Malcolm Graham may refer to:

Malcolm Graham (footballer) (1934–2015), English footballer who played for Barnsley and Leyton Orient
Malcolm Graham (politician) (born 1963), Democratic member of the North Carolina senate
Malcolm Graham (arms dealer) (1832–1899) of Schuyler, Hartley and Graham
Malcolm Graham (priest) (1849–1931), Archdeacon of Stoke
Malcolm D. Graham (1827–1878), Confederate politician